Andrew Bruckmiller (January 1, 1882 – January 12, 1970) was a professional baseball pitcher. He appeared in one game in Major League Baseball for the Detroit Tigers in 1905, giving up three runs in one inning.

External links

Major League Baseball pitchers
Detroit Tigers players
Petersburg Goobers players
Newport News Shipbuilders players
Baseball players from Pennsylvania
1882 births
1970 deaths